Zharkhan is the name of several rural localities in the Sakha Republic, Russia.

Zharkhan, Nyurbinsky District, Sakha Republic, a selo in Zharkhansky Rural Okrug of Nyurbinsky District
Zharkhan, Olyokminsky District, Sakha Republic, a selo in Zharkhansky Rural Okrug of Olyokminsky District

See also
Arylakh (Zharkhan), a selo in Zharkhansky Rural Okrug of Suntarsky District of the Sakha Republic